Patrick Lynch (born 1659, date of death unknown) was allegedly healed by a miracle.

Background
Lynch was the son of Patrick Lynch fitz Maurice and Redise Lynch of Galway. In 1673, aged about fourteen, he was "visited with a most grivious, desperat, and dangerus disease, and given over by all the doctors to be incurable, and could not eate one bite since Ester last, and what little sustenance of milke hee would take hee presently vometted the same, soe all things were prepared for his death, and no humane hopes of his recovery."

St Augustine's Well
Lynch was taken to the local well of St. Augustine at Lough Atalia, on 11 June. There he was "totally diped in the said well, aving no fileing [feeling] thereof, and being brought upp was wrapped by Mary Burke in a wollin plaide (woollen plaid)." He was left to sleep for about fifteen minutes till his mother woke him. He began to cry, blaming her for interrupting a vision he was having of "Our Lord Jesus Christ and his blessed mother and a multitude of brave winged birdes."

Lynch asked his mother to bring him a cup of water from the well, which he drank, and was able to then get up and walk unsupported. He told his mother that he was to "visit the well neine dayes, and to drinke thereof three tymes in etech day, and that he would doe well, and douth to continue since to observe the same dayly, and since is cured of the vomitting disease, and douth eath and drink ever since with a great apetit and desire, and douth slipe well."

Aftermath
An examination of all the relevant witness was taken on 23 June 1673 at Galway. They included Patrick and his parents—his father stating that he had prepared a coffin for his son's death—the warden of Galway, and ten other local notables, including the Priors of the Augustinians and Dominicans.

References
 "Holy Wells of Galway City", Peader O'Dowd, Journal of the Galway Archaeological and Historical Society, volume 60, 2008, pp. 138–145.

Christian miracles
Lynch (Galway) Patrick
1659 births
Year of death unknown